Richard Wesley Konter (1882–1979) was a Chief Radioman in the U.S. Navy, member of the Byrd Arctic and Antarctic Expeditions and a musician.

Explorer
Konter joined the Navy in 1897 at the age of 15, and was a veteran of the Spanish‐American War. He worked his way up to Chief Radioman in the US Navy and retired after twenty-nine years in the service. Konter had sailed up and down the South Seas and the China Sea and had survived typhoons and the Boxer Rebellion.  Around his arms coiled a pair of dragons that had been tattooed in Shanghai.

Konter was a member of Richard E. Byrd's expeditions to the Arctic and the Antarctic in 1926 and 1929.  The Konter Cliffs in Antarctica where named after him.

He sent out hundreds of Christmas Cards from Antarctica in 1929 to his correspondents, many not arriving until the following year.

Music career

Konter played all of the string instruments (as well as many other instruments) and brought two ukuleles, a mandolin, and several harmonicas aboard the SS Chantier for the 1926 Arctic Expedition with Byrd.  The ukulele had come to the U.S. from Hawaii in 1915 and was all the rage.  Konter planned to introduce the instrument to the “Eskimos” being unaware that there weren't any Inuit in Svalbard.  He was described as forty-four and slender with a long nose and crooked smile.  His cheerful disposition and musical ability made him the life of the party.

Konter, with the help of pilot Floyd Bennett, smuggled a Martin 1K ukulele into a stack of furs in the airplane that made the first flight over the North Pole on May 9, 1926.  Upon return, he had many of the participants sign the instrument and added many signatures to it over the years.  It is on permanent display in the Martin Museum after he traded the ukulele for a Martin Guitar. Archaeologist Larry Bartram and Dick Boak of Martin are working to identify the signatures. Over 155 signatures are on the instrument, including President Calvin Coolidge, Amelia Earhart and Thomas Edison. C.F. Martin has produced a limited number of replicas of the signed ukulele.

He took Favilla brand ukuleles on the Antarctic Expeditions, with one flown over the South Pole.  A signed instrument was given to the Favilla Company for their museum.

From about 1930 to 1970, he led a band and a group of entertainers that performed in the New York area at children's shelters and hospitals for the chronically ill and at homes for the aged.

He also filed for a patent on a new version of the Harp US 2401571 A which was accepted in 1946 and expired in 1963.

Recognition
 Honorary Member of the Radio Club of America - 1970
 The Edgar F. Johnson Pioneer Citation, Radio Club of America - 1975

Personal life 
He died at the Veterans Administration Hospital in Fort Hamilton, Brooklyn at age 97.  He was a life-long resident of Brooklyn. Konter was married to Johanna Pool.

Publications

 Dick's Ukulele Method, 1923, Edward B Marks Music Co., New York
 Dick's Improved Ukulele Method, 1924, Edward B Marks Music Co., New York
 Dick's Ukulele System, 1926, Edward B Marks Music Co., New York
 Shipmates Ahoy, 1963, A Geneva Book, ASIN: B000RF2J2A

References 

American military personnel of the Spanish–American War
1882 births
1979 deaths
United States Navy sailors
American ukulele players
Musicians from Brooklyn